Pomponius Porphyrion (or Porphyrio) was a Latin grammarian and commentator on Horace.

Biography
He was possibly a native of Africa, and flourished during the 2nd century A.D. (according to some, much later).

Works
His scholia on Horace, which are still extant, mainly consist of rhetorical and grammatical explanations. We probably do not possess the original work, which must have suffered from alterations and interpolations at the hands of the copyists of the Middle Ages, but on the whole the scholia form a valuable aid to the student of Horace.

Editions
Acronis et Porphyrionis commentarii in Q. Horatium Flaccum. Edidit Ferdinandus Hauthal, vol. 1, vol. 2, Berolini sumptibus Julii Springeri, 1864.
Pomponii Porhyrionis commentarii in Q. Horatium Flaccum, recensuit Gulielmus Meyer spirensis, Lipsiae in aedibus B. G. Teubneri, 1874.
Pomponi Porfyrionis commentum in Horatium Flaccum, A. Holder, ed., Arno Press, 1894.

See also C. F. Urba, Meletemata porphyrionea (1885).

References

 This work in turn cites:
 E. Schweikert, De Porphyrionis . . . scholiis Horatianis (1865)
 F. Pauly, Quaestiones criticae de . . . Porphyrionis commentariis Horatianis (1858)

External links
 Pomponi Porphyrionis commentarium in Horatium Flaccum at www.horatius.net.

Grammarians of Latin
Post–Silver Age Latin writers
Horace
Pomponius